Éder Guerrero Murillo (born March 25, 1992), known as Éder Guerrero, is an American professional soccer player who currently plays for Los Angeles Force in the National Independent Soccer Association.

References

External links
 
 
 NISA profile

1992 births
Living people
Footballers from Michoacán
Mexican footballers
Sportspeople from Morelia
Association football midfielders
Ascenso MX players
Sportspeople from San Bernardino, California
Soccer players from California
Monarcas Morelia Premier players
Atlético San Luis footballers
Tecamachalco F.C. footballers
Toros Neza footballers
Loros UdeC footballers
Atlético Estado de México players
Los Angeles Force players
National Independent Soccer Association players